James Gair Cameron (born 31 January 1986, Harare, Zimbabwe) is a Zimbabwean cricketer, a left-handed batsman and right-arm medium-pace bowler.

Educated at St George's College, Harare, Cameron represented Zimbabwe at under-15 and under-19 level. At under-19 level he played in four Youth One-Day Internationals in 2004, opening the batting with Brendan Taylor; his scores were 1, 0, 84* and 68 (a total of 153 runs at 51.0); his solitary wicket was Angelo Mathews, lbw.

During his four years of study at the University of Western Australia in Perth, he played Western Australian Grade Cricket for University CC. His time with University CC yielded a total of 2267 runs at 45.34; during the 2009–10 season he scored 608 runs in 13 innings at 60.8.

He signed for Worcestershire at the start of the 2010 season. In Worcestershire's final match of the 2010 season, Cameron scored 105, his maiden first-class century, sharing a partnership of 215 with Moeen Ali (who scored 115) to secure Worcestershire's promotion to the first division of the County Championship.

He retired from professional cricket at the end of the 2012 season to pursue a career in financial services.

References

External links
CricketArchive statistics
Cricinfo player profile

Zimbabwean people of British descent
1986 births
Living people
Cricketers from Harare
Zimbabwean cricketers
White Zimbabwean sportspeople
Worcestershire cricketers
Alumni of St. George's College, Harare